Cuneocytheridae is a family of ostracods belonging to the order Podocopida.

Genera:
 Cuneocythere Lienenklaus, 1894
 Dicrorygma Poag, 1962

References

Ostracods